Shuqiang Li is a Chinese arachnologist and a professor at the Institute of Zoology of the Chinese Academy of Sciences. Li is best known for his work with spiders and has described hundreds of new species and many genera. He is Editor in Chief of the journal Zoological Systematics (formerly Acta Zootaxonomica Sinica).

Selected publications 

 Tong, Y.F. & Li, S.Q (2007) One new genus and four new species of oonopid spiders from Southwest China (Araneae: Oonopidae). Annales Zoologici 57(2): 331-340.
 Wang X.P., Zhu M.S. & Li S (2010) A review of the coelotine genus Eurocoelotes (Araneae: Amaurobiidae). Journal of Arachnology 38: 79–98.
 Lin, Y., & Li, S (2014) Mysmenidae (Arachnida, Araneae), a spider family newly recorded from Vietnam. Zootaxa, 3826(1), 169–194. 10.11646/zootaxa.3826.1.5
 Chang Liu, Fengyuan Li, Shuqiang Li, et al (2017) Five new genera of the subfamily Psilodercinae (Araneae: Ochyroceratidae) from Southeast Asia. Zoological Systematics, 42(4): 395-417.
 Tong Y, Chen H, Liu S, Li S (2018) A new genus of oonopid spiders from Myanmar (Araneae, Oonopidae). ZooKeys 794: 31-43. 10.3897/zookeys.794.29156
 Chang W-J, Li S (2019) Fourteen new species of the spider genus Thaiderces from Southeast Asia (Araneae, Psilodercidae). ZooKeys 869: 103-146. 10.3897/zookeys.869.35546
 Chang W-J, Li S (2020) Thirty-one new species of the spider genus Leclercera from Southeast Asia (Araneae, Psilodercidae). ZooKeys 913: 1-87. 10.3897/zookeys.913.48650
 Lin Y, Li S (2020) Two new genera and eight new species of jumping spiders (Araneae, Salticidae) from Xishuangbanna, Yunnan, China. ZooKeys 952: 95-128. 10.3897/zookeys.952.51849
 Chang W-J, Yao Z, Li S (2020) Twenty-eight new species of the spider genus Merizocera Fage, 1912 (Araneae, Psilodercidae) from South and Southeast Asia. ZooKeys 961: 41-118. 10.3897/zookeys.961.53058
 Xu H, Zhang X, Yao Z, Ali A, Li S (2021) Thirty-five new species of the spider genus Pimoa (Araneae, Pimoidae) from Pan-Himalaya. ZooKeys 1029: 1-92. 10.3897/zookeys.1029.64080
 Cheng W, Bian D, Tong Y, Li S (2021) A new genus and two new species of oonopid spiders from Tibet, China (Araneae, Oonopidae). ZooKeys 1052: 55-69. 10.3897/zookeys.1052.66402

References

1965 births
Living people
20th-century Chinese zoologists
Members of the Chinese Academy of Sciences
Arachnologists